Walter Campbell may refer to:

Sir Walter Campbell (judge) (1921–2004), Australian judge and governor of Queensland, Australia
Walter Campbell (field hockey) (1886–1967), Irish athlete in field hockey
Walter Campbell of Shawfield (1741–1816), rector of the University of Glasgow, 1789–1791
Skip Campbell (Walter G. Campbell, 1948–2018), mayor of Coral Springs
Walter G. Campbell (chemist) (1877–1963), American chemist
Walter H. Campbell (1876–1944), American businessman, lawyer, and politician
Walter Frederick Campbell (1798–1855), Scottish politician
Walter Campbell (British Army officer) (1864–1936), former Quartermaster-General to the Forces
Menzies Campbell (born 1941), British politician
Walter Ruggles Campbell (1890–1981), Canadian physician and diabetologist
Walter Stanley Campbell (1877–1957), American author who wrote as Stanley Vestal
Walter Campbell Smith (1887–1988), British mineralogist, in later life formally known as Walter Campbell-Smith
 Walter E. Campbell (died 1993), Boston architect, founding partner at Campbell, Aldrich & Nulty

See also
Wally Campbell (1926–1954), stock car, midget, and sprint car racer